Blood in My Eye is a book of political philosophy written by George Jackson, a co-founder of the Black Guerrilla Family. Jackson finished writing the book only days before he was killed during an escape attempt from San Quentin State Prison on 21 August 1971. The book was first published on 1 January 1972.

Background 
In 1961, George Jackson was sentenced to one year to life in San Quentin State Prison for armed robbery. During his time at San Quentin, Jackson was introduced to Marxist ideas by W.L. Nolen, a fellow inmate. The two founded the Black Guerrilla Family in 1966, based on Marxist–Leninist principles. During his time in prison, Jackson educated himself on history and Marxist economics.

Using a plastic typewriter, Jackson wrote many letters and political essays, which were later complied in the books Soledad Brother: The Prison Letters of George Jackson and Blood in My Eye.

Content

Overview 
Blood in My Eye begins with the statement:We must accept the eventuality of bringing the U.S.A. to its knees; accept the closing off of critical sections of the city with barbed wire, armored pig carriers crisscrossing the streets, soldiers everywhere, tommy guns pointed at stomach level, smoke curling black against the daylight sky, the smell of cordite, house-to-house searches, doors being kicked in, the commonness of death.Jackson discusses various topics such as the use of guerrilla warfare against the United States government, class struggle and American fascism. The content is presented as a series of essays and letters. In the book, Jackson describes himself as a "Marxist-Leninist-Maoist-Fanonist".

Guerrilla warfare 
Jackson devotes a large portion of the book to urban guerrilla warfare strategies to be used against the police and military. For example, he describes a makeshift armored vehicle which is equipped with flamethrowers, machine guns and rocket launchers. He attributes this idea to this brother Jonathan Jackson. Furthermore, he advocates for the assassination of reactionary leaders.

Reception 
Melvin Maddocks from Life described the book as "a remarkable portrait of a remarkable man". Maitland Zane from the San Francisco Chronicle described the book as "muscular, eloquent and poetically defiant". David Lewis of The New York Times criticised the book, claiming that it "lacks the visceral brilliance, the epistolary panache, and the sense of personal growth and complexity stamping the letters and essays in 'Soledad Brother'."

References 

1972 books
American political philosophy literature
Black Power
Marxist books